Kempile Airport  is an airport serving the Fimi River town of Kutu in Mai-Ndombe Province, Democratic Republic of the Congo.

See also

 Transport in the Democratic Republic of the Congo
 List of airports in the Democratic Republic of the Congo

References

External links
 OpenStreetMap - Kutu-Kempili Airport
 FallingRain - Kempile
 HERE Maps - Kempile
 OurAirports - Kempile

Airports in Mai-Ndombe Province